Sven Benken (born 20 April 1970) is a German former professional footballer who worked as a manager for SG Burg. He spent five seasons in the Bundesliga with Werder Bremen and Hansa Rostock.

Honours
Energie Cottbus
 DFB-Pokal: runner-up 1996–97

Werder Bremen
 DFB-Pokal: 1998–99
 DFB-Ligapokal: runner-up 1999
 UEFA Intertoto Cup: 1998

References

External links
 

1970 births
Living people
People from Lauchhammer
People from Bezirk Cottbus
Association football midfielders
German footballers
East German footballers
FC Energie Cottbus players
SV Werder Bremen players
FC Hansa Rostock players
Dresdner SC players
Bundesliga players
Footballers from Brandenburg